Choudhary Multan Singh was an Indian politician.  He was elected to the Lok Sabha, the lower house of the Parliament of India from the Jalesar, Uttar Pradesh  as a member of the Janata Dal.

References

External links
Official biographical sketch in Parliament of India website

Janata Dal politicians
1915 births
1990 deaths